Akira Saitō may refer to:

, Japanese actress
, Japanese motorcycle racer